Battle of Battle of Dromore may refer to:

Battle of Dromore (1649) a victory in 1649 for Colonel Robert Venables the commander of three regiments of Cromwellians over an Irish Royalist force under the command of Colonel Mark Trevor.
Break of Dromore a battle fought during the Williamite War in Ireland on 14 March 1689. The battle was a victory for the Catholic Jacobite troops under Richard Hamilton over Protestant Williamites.